Dominance and submission is a subset of BDSM.

Dominance and submission may also refer to:

 Dominance hierarchy, dominance and submission in human or primate behavior
 "Dominance and Submission", a 1974 song by Blue Öyster Cult from Secret Treaties

See also 
 Dominance (disambiguation)
 Domination (disambiguation)
 Submission (disambiguation)